"Violent Thing" is a song by Slovenian singer Ben Dolic. It would have represented Germany in the Eurovision Song Contest 2020 prior to its cancellation due to the COVID-19 pandemic. The song was released as a digital download on 27 February 2020. The song was written by Borislav Milanov, Peter St. James, Dag Lundberg, Jimmy Thorén and Connor Martin.

Background
The song was chosen to represent Germany in the Eurovision Song Contest 2020 by both a Eurovision Jury composed of 100 people from all over Germany and an international expert jury of 20 music professionals who have all been part of their home country's national juries at some point. Both juries have evaluated all submitted artists, as well as the publicly submitted songs. Talking about his selection, Dolic said, "When I got the news that I had been accepted by the juries, I was totally overwhelmed. Taking part in the Eurovision Song Contest for Germany was a dream come true for me. This is where I made my breakthrough as a professional singer. I think we have the perfect song for the Eurovision Song Contest, and I will give everything I have for Germany."

Eurovision Song Contest
The song would have represented Germany in the Eurovision Song Contest 2020, after Ben Dolic was internally selected by the national broadcaster NDR. As Germany is a member of the "Big Five", the song automatically advanced to the final, which would have been held on 16 May 2020 in Rotterdam, Netherlands. The contest was cancelled due to the COVID-19 pandemic.

Release history

References

2020 songs
2020 singles
Eurovision songs of 2020
Eurovision songs of Germany
Songs written by Borislav Milanov